Tropidophis caymanensis, or the Cayman Islands dwarf boa, is a species of snake in the family Tropidophiidae and is classified as critically endangered. It is endemic to the Cayman Islands.

References

Tropidophiidae
Reptiles described in 1938
Endemic fauna of the Cayman Islands
Snakes of the Caribbean
Endemic fauna of the Caribbean